The Gloeophyllales are a phylogenetically defined order of wood-decay fungi that is characterized by the ability to produce a brown rot of wood. It includes a single, identically defined family, the Gloeophyllaceae, in which are included the genera Gloeophyllum,  Neolentinus, Heliocybe, and Veluticeps.

References

 
Basidiomycota orders
Monotypic fungus taxa